The Laos women's national football team is the female representative football team for Laos.

History
In 2005, the country was one of seven teams that included Brunei, Thailand, Indonesia, East Timor, Malaysia, Cambodia, Laos, Vietnam, Burma and Singapore, that were expected to field a women's football team to compete at the Asian Games in Marikina in December.

In 2013, Japanese coach Honma Kei took up Lao women's national team as head coach.

Team image

Home stadium
The Laos women's national team play their home matches on the New Laos National Stadium.

Results and fixtures

The following is a list of match results in the last 12 months, as well as any future matches that have been scheduled.
Legend

2021

2022

Coaching staff

Current coaching staff

Managerial history

 Vongmisay Soubouakham (20??–2021)
 Pathana Kuntiyavong (2021)
 Vongmisay Soubouakham (2022–present)

Players

Current squad
The following players were named on dd mmm 2013 for the 2013 SEA Games.

Caps and goals accurate up to and including 1 October 2021.

Recent call-ups
The following players have been called up to the Laos squad in the past 12 months.

Records

*Active players in bold, statistics correct as of 1 October 2021.

Most capped players

Top goalscorers

Competitive record

FIFA Women's World Cup

Olympic Games

AFC Women's Asian Cup

Asian Games

AFF Women's Championship

SEA Games

Honours

See also

Sport in Laos
Football in Laos
Laos national football team
Laos national football team results
Laos national under-23 football team
Laos national under-21 football team
Laos national under-20 football team
Laos national under-17 football team
Laos national futsal team
Laos national beach soccer team

References

External links

Asian women's national association football teams
women